ARC 7 de Agosto (D-06) was a Swedish-built destroyer of the Colombian Navy. The ship, laid down in November 1955 as 13 de Junio, was built by the firm of Gotaverken in Gothenburg to the same design as the Royal Swedish Navy's  of destroyers, with the exception that they had a third 120 mm turret in place of the 57 mm AA turret. The ship was launched on 19 June 1956 and completed on 31 October 1958. After a career that spanned almost 30 years, the ship was scrapped in 1984.

External links
 Miramarshipindex.org entry

 

Halland-class destroyers of the Colombian Navy
Ships built in Gothenburg
1956 ships
Destroyers of the Cold War